The 1925 Utah State Aggies football team was an American football team that represented Utah State Agricultural College in the Rocky Mountain Conference (RMC) during the 1925 college football season. In their seventh season under head coach Dick Romney, the Aggies compiled a 6–1 record (5–1 against RMC opponents), finished in a tie for second place in the RMC, and outscored all opponents by a total of 111 to 39.

Schedule

References

Utah Agricultural
Utah State Aggies football seasons
Utah State Aggies football